The 2013–14 CONCACAF Champions League was the 6th edition of the CONCACAF Champions League under its current name, and overall the 49th edition of the premier football club competition organized by CONCACAF, the regional governing body of North America, Central America and the Caribbean. Monterrey were the three-time defending champions, but were unable to defend their title as they failed to qualify for the tournament.

Cruz Azul won a record-setting sixth CONCACAF club title (and their first during the Champions League era), after winning an all-Mexican final over Toluca on away goals. As a result, they qualified as the CONCACAF representative at the 2014 FIFA Club World Cup.

Qualification

Twenty-four teams participate in the CONCACAF Champions League: nine from the North American Zone, twelve from the Central American Zone, and three from the Caribbean Zone.

Clubs may be disqualified and replaced by a club from another association if the club does not have an available stadium that meets CONCACAF regulations for safety. If a club's own stadium fails to meet the set standards then it may find a suitable replacement stadium within its own country. However, if it is still determined that the club cannot provide the adequate facilities then it runs the risk of being replaced.

North America
Nine teams from the North American Football Union qualify to the Champions League. Mexico and the United States are each allocated four spots, the most of any of the CONCACAF's member associations, while Canada is granted one spot in the tournament.

For Mexico, the winners of the Liga MX Apertura and Clausura tournaments earn berths in Pot A of the tournament's group stage, while the Apertura and Clausura runners-up earn berths in Pot B.

For the United States, three spots are allocated through the Major League Soccer (MLS) regular season and playoffs; the fourth spot is allocated to the winner of its domestic cup competition, the Lamar Hunt U.S. Open Cup. The MLS Cup winner and the Supporters' Shield winner (if U.S.-based) are placed in Pot A; the MLS Cup runner-up (if U.S.-based) and the U.S. Open Cup winner are placed in Pot B. If any of the above spots are taken by a Canada-based MLS team, the Champions League place is allocated to the U.S.-based team with the best MLS regular season record who has failed to otherwise qualify.

For Canada, the winner of the domestic cup competition, the Voyageurs Cup competed for in the Canadian Championship, earns the lone Canadian berth into the tournament, in Pot B.

Central America
Twelve teams from the Central American Football Union qualify to the Champions League. The allocation is as follows: two teams from each of Costa Rica, Honduras, Guatemala, Panama and El Salvador, and one team from each of Nicaragua and Belize.

For the Central American teams that qualify via split seasons, the aggregate record of the two tournaments within the season is used to determine which team gains the association's top spot. The pots of the teams are as follows:
The top teams from the leagues of Costa Rica, Honduras, Guatemala and Panama are placed in Pot A.
The top team from the league of El Salvador, and the second teams from the leagues of Costa Rica and Honduras are placed in Pot B.
The second teams from the leagues of Guatemala, Panama and El Salvador, and the teams from the leagues of Nicaragua and Belize are placed in Pot C.

If one or more clubs is precluded, it is supplanted by a club from another Central American association. The reallocation is based on results from previous Champions League tournaments.

Caribbean
Three teams from the Caribbean Football Union qualify to the Champions League. The three berths, in Pot C, are allocated to the top three finishers of the CFU Club Championship, a subcontinental tournament for clubs from associations of the Caribbean Football Union. In order for a team to qualify for the CFU Club Championship, they usually need to finish as the champion or runner-up of their respective association's league in the previous season, but professional teams may also be selected by their associations if they play in the league of another country.

If any Caribbean club is precluded, it is supplanted by the fourth-place finisher from the CFU Club Championship.

Teams
The following teams qualified for the tournament.

In the following table, the number of appearances, last appearance, and previous best result count only those in the CONCACAF Champions League era starting from 2008–09 (not counting those in the era of the Champions' Cup from 1962 to 2008).

Notes

Draw
The draw for the group stage was held on June 3, 2013 at Doral, Florida, United States.

The 24 teams were drawn into eight groups of three, with each group containing one team from each of the three pots. The allocation of teams into pots was based on their national association and qualifying berth. Teams from the same association (excluding "wildcard" teams which replace a team from another association) could not be drawn with each other in the group stage, and each group was guaranteed to contain a team from either the United States or Mexico, meaning U.S. and Mexican teams could not play each other in the group stage.

Schedule
The schedule of the competition was as follows.

Group stage

In the group stage, each group was played on a home-and-away round-robin basis. The winners of each group advanced to the championship stage.

Tiebreakers
The teams are ranked according to points (3 points for a win, 1 point for a draw, 0 points for a loss). If tied on points, tiebreakers are applied in the following order:
Greater number of points earned in matches between the teams concerned
Greater goal difference in matches between the teams concerned
Greater number of goals scored away from home in matches between the teams concerned
Reapply first three criteria if two or more teams are still tied
Greater goal difference in all group matches
Greater number of goals scored in group matches
Greater number of goals scored away in all group matches
Drawing of lots

Group 1

Group 2

Group 3

Group 4

Group 5

Group 6

Group 7

Group 8

Championship stage

In the championship stage, the eight teams played a single-elimination tournament. Each tie was played on a home-and-away two-legged basis. The away goals rule was used if the aggregate score was level after normal time of the second leg, but not after extra time, and so a tie was decided by penalty shoot-out if the aggregate score was level after extra time of the second leg.

Seeding

Bracket

Quarterfinals

Semifinals

Final

Awards

Top goalscorers

See also
2014 FIFA Club World Cup

References

External links
CONCACAF Champions League, CONCACAF.com

 
1
CONCACAF Champions League seasons